Nairn is a community in the municipality of North Middlesex, located in Middlesex County, Ontario.

Nairn is a small community originally named East Williams. It has a population of around three hundred and sixty people. It contains a public school, a community park, a feed store, a bus depot, an antiques dealer, a local community church and a cemetery.

Communities in Middlesex County, Ontario